Impeccable Henri (French: L'Impeccable Henri) is a 1948 French comedy film directed by Charles-Félix Tavano and starring Claude Dauphin, Marcelle Derrien and Félix Oudart.

The film's sets were designed by Robert-Jules Garnier.

Cast
 René Alone 
 Armand Bernard as Lopez  
 Charles Bouillaud 
 Claude Dauphin as Henri - le majordome  
 Marcelle Derrien as Ève Fournier-Salville  
 Christiane Derèze  
 Hélène Garaud as La bonne  
 Mona Goya as Elvire  
 Yette Lucas as La cuisinière  
 Félix Oudart as L'homme d'affaires Fournier-Salville  
 Georges Paulais as Le jardinier 
 Michel Roux as Tony  
 Albert Rémy as Gustave  
 Raymond Soukoff  
 Jean Wall as Gérard

References

Bibliography 
 Philippe Rège. Encyclopedia of French Film Directors, Volume 1. Scarecrow Press, 2009.

External links 
 

1948 films
1948 comedy films
French comedy films
1940s French-language films
Films directed by Charles-Félix Tavano
French black-and-white films
1940s French films